Marek Noormets (born 14 June 1971) is an Estonian basketball player.

He was born in Tartu. In 2003 he graduated from the University of Tartu's Institute of Physical Education.

He began his basketball career in 1988, coached by Harri Russak. Later his coaches were Arne Laos and Jaak Salumets. 1990–1996 he played for Kalev. 1990–2002 he was a member of Estonia men's national basketball team.

He has also practiced competitive dance for 10 years.

References

Living people
1971 births
Estonian men's basketball players
BC Tallinn Kalev players
University of Tartu alumni
Estonian male dancers
Sportspeople from Tartu